Farlington School is an independent day and boarding school for pupils aged four to eighteen in Horsham, West Sussex, England. Farlington was founded in 1896 originally as a girls' school in Haywards Heath but moved to its present site at Strood Park near Horsham in 1955. Farlington joined the Bellevue Education group in September 2019. The school also has a long association with the University of Chichester in the field of teacher education.

The school

Farlington has over 300 pupils, and became co-educational in most year groups in September 2020, becoming fully co-educational the following year. The school is made up of the Lower School (Reception to Year 4), the Middle School (Years 5 to 8) and the Senior School (Years 9 to 13). The oldest building on the site is the Jacobean Mansion House, housing the Reception and Library on the ground floor. Teaching buildings include the New Courtyard buildings, the Peto  Building, the Moberly Building, the Simpson Science block, the Sixth Form Centre  and the Johnson Sports Hall. The former chapel is the Drama Studio.

For the most part, students attend as day pupils; however, Farlington also offers boarding from the age of 8, on a full, weekly or occasional basis. Boarding accommodation is on the upper floors of the Mansion House. The boarding community is both British and international.

Farlington's distinctive uniform features a French navy jacket embroidered with the school's 'clock tower' logo for all pupils. Most  girls wear the blue and green tartan kilt, (although grey trousers are now an alternative).

The School houses were renamed in 2020 as a result of a student vote and are: Luther King,  Hawking and Parks.

Heads
 Miss Edith Buller, 1896-1898
 Miss Charlotte Moberly 1898-1936
 Miss Isabel Moberly, 1898-1942
 Miss Effie Simpson 1942-1971
 Mrs Mary Shewell, 1971-1974
 Mrs Dorothy Khoo, later Harrington, 1974-1976
 Mrs Olive Peto, 1977-1987
 Mrs Patricia Metham, 1987-1992
 Mrs Trina Mawer, 1992-2006
 Mrs Jonnie Goyer, 2006-2012
 Ms Louise Higson, 2012–2021
 Mr James Passam 2021–present

Notable alumni

 Alexandra Harris, author and professor.
Jill Hyem, actress and British radio and television writer
Jemma Powell, graduated from the Oxford School of Drama in 2002; actress; made her screen debut in 2001 in The Hole; also known for roles in François Ozon's Angel and Tim Burton's Alice in Wonderland
Angela Thorne, known for her roles in To the Manor Born as Audrey fforbes-Hamilton’s best friend Marjory Frobisher, and as Margaret Thatcher in Anyone for Denis?

References

Notes
Farlington School Centenary 1896-1996 by Elizabeth Garrett

External links
Farlington School website
 Bellvue Education

Educational institutions established in 1896
Girls' schools in West Sussex
Private schools in West Sussex
Member schools of the Girls' Schools Association
1896 establishments in England